Garad Ali Garad Jama was the 19th garad of the Dhulbahante Garadate, from 1966 until 1985, although he was the effective supreme Garad of the Dhulbahante from as early as the 1950s. He is best known for his role as head of the USP party.

USP political party

As the head of USP, he oversaw the successful election bids of 13 USP representatives, wherein Garad Ali Garad Jama himself became the first post-independence representative of Las Anod city:

References

People from Las Anod
20th-century Somalian people
Somali sultans
Dhulbahante
Somali monarchs